Emu Bay may refer to
Emu Bay (South Australia), a bay
 Emu Bay, South Australia, a locality
 Emu Bay Shale, a geological formation associated with the above locality
 Emu Bay (Tasmanian geographic feature), on the northwest coast
 Burnie, Tasmania, formerly Emu Bay
 City of Burnie, formerly the Municipality of Emu Bay
 Emu Bay Railway, or its replacement Melba Line
 The Advocate (Tasmania), formerly the Emu Bay Times